Acan or ACAN may refer to:
 Acan (god), a Maya deity
 Advisory Committee on Antarctic Names
 ACAN (gene), a gene coding for the aggrecan protein
 ACAN-EFE, a news agency

See also
 Akan (disambiguation)
 Achan (disambiguation)